Aleksandrs Macijevskis (born June 26, 1975) is a Latvian professional ice hockey player, currently playing for HK Kurbads of the Latvian Hockey League (LHL).

Playing career
Macijevskis began his career in Dinamo Riga, however he only played for Dinamo successor Pārdaugava Rīga, where he played for tree seasons through 1992–93 to 1994–95.

He spent most of his career in Denmark where he played for several clubs, most notably for Odense Bulldogs. During his career he has played in Finland, Belarus, Norway and Sweden.

International
Macijevskis played for team Latvia in World Championships and in 2002 Winter Olympics. From 1996 till 2005 he was regular on team Latvia roster.

Career statistics

Regular season and playoffs

LAT totals do not include stats from the 1995–96 season.

International

References

External links
 
 
 
 

1975 births
Living people
Ice hockey players at the 2002 Winter Olympics
Latvian ice hockey right wingers
Odense Bulldogs players
Olympic ice hockey players of Latvia
Ice hockey people from Riga